EuroBasket 2015 was the 39th edition of the EuroBasket championship that was organized by FIBA Europe. It was co-hosted by Croatia, France, Germany, and Latvia, making it the first EuroBasket held in more than one country. It started on 5 September and ended on 20 September 2015.

The top two teams ( and ) qualified to the 2016 Summer Olympics. The next five teams (and the ) advanced to the World Olympic Qualifying Tournaments.  and  later qualified due to Serbia and Italy hosting two of the Olympic qualifying tournaments while  also qualified as an invitee.

Spain won their third title by defeating Lithuania 80–63 in the final. France won bronze on home soil defeating Serbia (81–68). The final game was held in the Stade Pierre-Mauroy and set a new record for the highest attendance in a EuroBasket game, with 26,922. Pau Gasol was named the tournament's MVP.

Host selection
On 18 December 2011, FIBA Europe decided to let Ukraine host EuroBasket 2015, after France, Croatia, Germany and Italy withdrew their joint bid. On 19 March 2014, tournament director Markiyan Lubkivsky announced that EuroBasket 2015 would not take place in Ukraine because of the Russo-Ukrainian War and the championship would be relocated. But later, FIBA Europe was forced to deny reports that Ukraine had given up the hosting rights for EuroBasket 2015 due to the continuous political situation and security issues in Ukraine. On 13 June 2014, FIBA Europe officially announced that Ukraine would not be hosting the championships.

Sixteen countries expressed an initial interest to bid for the relocated event. National Federations were called by FIBA Europe to officially bid for hosting the tournament or parts of the tournament until 31 July 2014. The next day FIBA Europe announced eight official bids from potential organizers:

 
 
 
 
 
 
 
 

All interested federations were provided the option to bid to stage either one of the four groups in the Group Phase of the tournament, one of the groups and the Final Phase, only the finals, or the entire tournament. FIBA Europe was scheduled to officially announce the details of the bids after 27 August 2014.

Croatia, France, Poland and Turkey bid to host one of the four groups in the Group Phase and the Final Phase in the knock-out round. Additionally, Turkey also bid to host the Final Phase only.

All other countries bid to host only one of the four groups in the Group Phase. Prior to the Board Meeting, Turkey withdrew their candidature from hosting any part of the tournament while Poland and Croatia withdrew their candidature to host the Final Phase of the tournament, leaving France as the only candidate to host the Final Phase.

On 8 September 2014, it was announced that the FIBA EuroBasket 2015 tournament would be hosted in Germany (Berlin), Croatia (Zagreb), Latvia (Riga) and France (Montpellier), with each of the countries hosting one respective group during the group stage of the tournament. France would be the hosts of the finals in the knock-out phase in the city of Lille at the multi-functional Stade Pierre-Mauroy, which has a 27,000 capacity for basketball.

Venues

Qualification

Qualification for the tournament took place in two phases; the first featured 13 teams who failed to qualify for FIBA EuroBasket 2013, the winner of which qualifying directly for the finals. The remaining teams then went into qualification with the remaining FIBA Europe sides.

Qualified teams

Draw

Seedings
FIBA Europe released the seedings for the EuroBasket 2015 draw on 27 November 2014. According to the FIBA Europe regulations the participating nations, the 10 participants of the 2014 World Cup would be seeded first, based on their respective records in FIBA EuroBasket 2013, with the remaining teams seeded based on their qualification records.

Final draw

The draw took place on 8 December 2014 at 16:00 at Disneyland in Paris, France. Criteria for the draw was as follows:
The four hosts were drawn together, but as Latvia were amongst the third seeded teams and Germany the fifth, only three teams would be in fourth and sixth pot containing the remaining seeds and these teams could not be drawn into groups with Latvia and Germany respectively. 
France and Croatia, as hosts, were drawn first and the two remaining first seeds, Spain and Lithuania, were drawn separately into the remaining two groups not already with a top-seeded team. 
In addition to this, following on from the exceptional circumstances leading to the relocation of EuroBasket 2015, each of the four hosts was granted the right to select a partner federation for commercial and marketing criteria. These teams would automatically be placed into the same group as their chosen partner country. The selections were;
 France and Finland
 Germany and Turkey
 Croatia and Slovenia 
 Latvia and Estonia 

 Assigned to Group A, for its partnership with France.
 Assigned to Group B, for its partnership with Germany.
 Assigned to Group C, for its partnership with Croatia.
 Assigned to Group D, for its partnership with Latvia.

Squads

Preliminary round
The best four teams of each group advance to the knockout stage.

Group A

Venue: Montpellier, France

Group B

Venue: Berlin, Germany

Group C

Venue: Zagreb, Croatia

Group D

Venue: Riga, Latvia

Knockout stage

Venue: Lille, France

Final

Final standings
Official final ranking by FIBA Europe.

All-Tournament Team
PG –  Sergio Rodríguez
SG –  Nando de Colo
SF –  Jonas Maciulis
PF –  Pau Gasol (MVP)
C –   Jonas Valanciunas

Statistical leaders

Points

Rebounds

Assists

Blocks

Steals

FIBA broadcasting rights

References

External links

Official website

 
2015
2015–16 in European basketball
September 2015 sports events in Europe
International basketball competitions hosted by France
International basketball competitions hosted by Croatia
International basketball competitions hosted by Germany
International basketball competitions hosted by Latvia
2015 in French sport
2015 in Croatian sport
2015 in German sport
2015 in Latvian sport
Sport in Lille
Sport in Montpellier
Sport in Zagreb
Sport in Riga
Sports competitions in Berlin